A constitutional referendum was held in Antigua and Barbuda on 6 November 2018, the first referendum in the country's history. The proposed constitutional amendment, which ultimately failed to pass, would have made the Caribbean Court of Justice the final court of appeal, replacing the London-based Judicial Committee of the Privy Council. A quorum of 66.6 % of the valid votes in favour was required for the amendment to be approved.

Grenada also held a referendum on joining the CCJ on the same day; that vote also failed to pass.

Question
Voters were asked to respond YES or NO to the following question:

Results
The final vote tally gave totals of 8,509 for the amendment and 9,234 against. Turnout was 33.6% of the electorate.

References

Antigua
Referendums in Antigua and Barbuda
Constitutional
Constitutional referendums
Antigua